James Alfred Birch (8 October 1888 – 11 December 1969) was a British philatelist who signed the Roll of Distinguished Philatelists in 1960.

Birch had award-winning collections of the stamps of Denmark, Norway, Sweden, Danish West Indies, Greenland, and Faroe Islands. He was a writer for numerous journals on Scandinavian topics and was awarded the Medal of Honour by the Copenhagen Philatelic Club for distinguished work in Danish philately.

References

Signatories to the Roll of Distinguished Philatelists
British philatelists
1888 births
1969 deaths